Dr. Argiris Mitsou (Greek: Αργύρης Μήτσου) (born April 7, 1950) is a Greek surgeon who for many years was the Greece national football team and Panathinaikos FC doctor. The Greek businessman Giannis Vardinogiannis (shareholder of Panathinaikos) promoted him as the team president in 2004, a position he held until June 2008, when Nikos Pateras was announced as the new team president.

References

1950 births
Living people
Greek football chairmen and investors
Greek surgeons
Panathinaikos F.C. presidents
20th-century Greek physicians
21st-century Greek physicians
20th-century surgeons